Franklin Edward Freeman, Jr. (born 1945) is a lawyer and public official in North Carolina, who retired from government service in 2009 as Senior Assistant for Governmental Affairs to Governor Mike Easley. 
He worked for Easley during the entirety of his two terms (2001–2009). As of 2009, Freeman is a partner in the McGuireWoods law firm and vice president of McGuireWoods Consulting.

Freeman, a native of Surry County, North Carolina, graduated from the University of North Carolina Law School and clerked for state Supreme Court Justice Dan K. Moore. Between 1971 and 1993, Freeman worked as a prosecutor and as an official at the North Carolina Administrative Office of the Courts. In 1992, Freeman was defeated in the Democratic Primary by Ralph Campbell in his bid to be State Auditor. Campbell became the first African-American to hold a statewide elected executive office in North Carolina.

Freeman became a close advisor to former state Governor Jim Hunt and served as Secretary of the state Department of Correction during Hunt's 1993-1997 term.  He then became Hunt's chief of staff and legislative counsel.

Hunt later appointed Freeman to fill a vacancy on the North Carolina Supreme Court, but Freeman was defeated in a bid to be elected to a full term on the Court in 2000 by current  Justice Robert H. Edmunds, Jr.. Under Gov. Easley, Freeman assumed a role similar to his post under Hunt.

References
"Freeman blended Mayberry manner with liberal views," News and Observer, Jan. 4, 2009.

1945 births
Living people
People from Surry County, North Carolina
University of North Carolina School of Law alumni
Justices of the North Carolina Supreme Court
State cabinet secretaries of North Carolina
North Carolina Democrats
North Carolina lawyers